During the 2017–18 season, Córdoba CF are participating in the Spanish LaLiga 123, and the Copa del Rey.

Squad

Transfers
List of Spanish football transfers summer 2017#Córdoba

In

Out

Competitions

Overall

Liga

League table

Matches

Kickoff times are in CET.

Copa del Rey

References

Córdoba CF seasons
Córdoba CF